Duckmanton South Junction is a former railway junction near Arkwright Town in Derbyshire, England.

Context
Duckmanton South Junction was one of four interrelated junctions built by the GCR to connect its main line to the LD&ECR's main line when it took the latter company over in 1907. The junctions are usually referred to collectively as "Duckmanton Junction" or occasionally as "Duckmanton Junctions."

Description
The four junctions operated interactively, so they are described together in the article Duckmanton Junction to which the reader is referred.

External links
 Duckmanton South Junction on old OS map via npemaps
 Duckmanton South Junction, southbound via flickr
 Duckmanton South Junction, northbound via flickr

References

Rail junctions in England
Rail transport in Derbyshire
Lancashire, Derbyshire and East Coast Railway structures